Boreland is a village in Dumfries and Galloway, Scotland, which is located in Eskdale about  north of Lockerbie on the B723 road to Eskdalemuir. The village has  a small primary school.

Boreland is the smallest village to be twinned with Toronto, the capital of the province of Ontario.

There is another small village called Boreland in Perthshire, one near Dysart in Fife and numerous hamlets and farms throughout Scotland, largely in the Central Belt and the south, with a particular prevalence in Dumfries and Galloway. The term is from the Scots "bordland" meaning "table-land" or "land which directly supplies the laird’s table".

References

Villages in Dumfries and Galloway